Edward Mikołaj Babiuch (28 December 1927 – 1 February 2021) was a Polish Communist political figure. He was one of four deputy chairmen of the Polish Council of State 1976–1980. Babiuch served as the 50th Prime Minister of Poland from 18 February to 24 August 1980. He died in February 2021 at the age of 93. He was the longest-lived former Polish prime minister, improving on the record of Adam Jerzy Czartoryski.

References

1927 births
2021 deaths
People from Dąbrowa Górnicza
People from Będzin County
People from Kielce Voivodeship (1919–1939)
Members of the Politburo of the Polish United Workers' Party
Prime Ministers of the Polish People's Republic
Members of the Polish Sejm 1969–1972
Members of the Polish Sejm 1972–1976
Members of the Polish Sejm 1976–1980
Recipients of the Order of Polonia Restituta (1944–1989)
Recipients of the Order of the Builders of People's Poland
Recipients of the Order of the Banner of Work